Based on a True Story is the ninth studio album by New York hardcore band Sick of It All. It was released on April 20, 2010, on the band's new label Century Media Records (though Abacus, their previous label, was a subsidiary of Century Media). It was the band's first album in four years, following the release of Death to Tyrants in 2006, the longest gap between albums in Sick of It All's career. Based on a True story was also available as an extremely limited German import only version that was packaged with a DVD titled New York Vs. London.
The DVD, which was recorded, edited and produced by Universal Warning Records, features a 5-camera shoot of 3 songs from a sold-out show in New York City from January 2008 – and a 3-camera shoot from a sold-out 2008 show in London. There is also a 15-minute European tour documentary that glues the program together.

Track listing
 "Death or Jail" - 2:51
 "The Divide" - 2:50
 "Dominated" - 2:09
 "A Month of Sundays" - 2:34
 "Braveheart" - 0:45
 "Bent Outta Shape" - 1:53
 "Lowest Common Denominator" - 2:18
 "Good Cop" - 2:28
 "Lifeline" - 2:34
 "Watch It Burn" - 2:34
 "Waiting for the Day" - 2:25
 "Long as She's Standing" - 2:34
 "Nobody Rules" - 2:39
 "Dirty Money" - 2:57

Credits
 Lou Koller – vocals
 Pete Koller – guitar
 Craig Setari – bass guitar
 Armand Majidi – drums

References

2010 albums
Sick of It All albums
Century Media Records albums
Albums produced by Tue Madsen